DC Comics is one of the largest and oldest American comic book publishers. It produces material featuring numerous well-known superhero characters, including Superman, Batman, Wonder Woman, Green Lantern, The Flash, Aquaman, and Green Arrow. Most of this material takes place in a shared fictional universe, which also features teams such as the Justice League, the Suicide Squad, and the Teen Titans. 

Film adaptations based on DC Comics properties have included serials, live action and animated feature films, direct-to-video releases, television films, and documentary films.

Live-action films

Feature films
All films produced by DC Studios, formerly DC Films, along with Man of Steel and Batman v Superman: Dawn of Justice, are set in the DC Extended Universe (DCEU) unless otherwise noted. Future installments will be set in the DC Universe (franchise).

Serials and short films

From DC imprints

Vertigo

Paradox Press

WildStorm

Television films

Episodes as films

Animated films

All the feature films are produced by Warner Bros. Animation, except as indicated.

Theatrically released films

Direct-to-video and television films

Episodes as films
Television series episodes released as direct-to-video films.

Lego versions
All films are direct-to-video, except as indicated.

Short films

Theatrical

Direct-to-video

Reception

Box office

Critical and public reception

From DC imprints

See also
 List of television series based on DC Comics publications
 List of video games based on DC Comics
 List of films based on Marvel Comics publications
 List of television series based on Marvel Comics publications
 Batman in film
 Superman in film
 DC Extended Universe
 List of unproduced DC Comics projects
 List of unproduced films based on DC Comics imprints

Notes

References

External links
 Movies at DC.com

 
DC Comics
DC Comics
DC Comics-related lists
DC Comics